Brian Leo John Hennessy, C.R., (7 January 1919 – 13 February 1997) was an American-born Roman Catholic bishop.

Hennessy, who was from Detroit, was ordained as a Catholic priest in 1950; and served as the Bishop of the Roman Catholic Diocese of Hamilton in Bermuda from 1975 to 1995.

References

1919 births
Bermudian Roman Catholic bishops
Clergy from Detroit
1997 deaths
Resurrectionist Congregation
20th-century Roman Catholic bishops in British Overseas Territories
Roman Catholic bishops of Hamilton in Bermuda
20th-century American clergy